Bekaraar is a 1983 Indian Hindi-language film directed by Rajendra Prasad V.B. The movie stars Sanjay Dutt, Padmini Kolhapure, Mohnish Bahl, Supriya Pathak in lead roles. The film was a remake of the Telugu film Nalugu Stambhalata.

Cast
 Sanjay Dutt as Shyam
 Padmini Kolhapure as Sundari Gupta
 Supriya Pathak as Nisha
 Mohnish Bahl as Pradeep
 Ashok Kumar as Pradeep's Father
 Om Shivpuri as Nisha's Father
 Chand Usmani as Laxmi

Soundtrack

External links
 

1983 films
1980s Hindi-language films
Films scored by Laxmikant–Pyarelal
Indian romantic drama films
Hindi remakes of Telugu films
1983 romantic drama films
Films directed by V. B. Rajendra Prasad